× Opsistylis, abbreviated Opst. in the horticultural trade, is a nothogenus for intergeneric hybrids between the orchid genera Rhynchostylis and Vandopsis (Rhy. x Vdps.).

References

Orchid nothogenera
Aeridinae